Christopher Charles Rix (born May 1, 1981) is a former American football quarterback. Rix is also widely known as a coach and sportscaster.

Early life
Chris Rix was born and raised in upstate New York. He is of Filipino, German, and Irish descent. Rix was primarily raised by his father Christopher Carroll Rix, after his mother died from cancer in 1989 when Rix was 7 years old. After his mother's death, Rix and his father moved to Seattle, WA and lived there from 1989–1995. Prior to entering high school, Rix and his father moved to Southern California to be closer to his family.
Chris Rix attended both Bishop Amat Memorial High School and Santa Margarita Catholic High School, graduating in 2000.

College career
Chris Rix is the first and only four year starter at quarterback (2001–2004) in the school's history, having played under Bobby Bowden. Chris Rix went 0-5 against Florida State University's rival, the University of Miami Hurricanes. Despite a severe ankle injury suffered early during his senior season, Rix ranks second in every major passing category at FSU. During Rix's career at Florida State, the Seminoles claimed three Atlantic Coast Conference (ACC) titles and appeared in four straight bowl games.

Rix had his most successful season in 2003 when he passed for 3,107 yards and 23 touchdowns. He ranks second in school history in passes attempted, completed, and touchdowns thrown. Rix missed the 2003 Sugar Bowl after he overslept and missed an exam while sleeping in his car in a handicap parking spot, subsequently causing him to be disciplined by sitting him for that year's final game.

Rix was named the Atlantic Coast Conference (ACC) freshman of the year, and he is the first, and only, four-year starter in Florida State history. His loyalty to Coach Bobby Bowden was the key factor in his decision to forego entering the NFL draft after his Junior year.

Broadcasting career
Rix went undrafted in the 2005 NFL Draft. He was invited to the San Diego Chargers' rookie camp on a tryout basis. Within the same year he began a career in sports broadcasting, first as a high school football analyst for Fox Sports Net in Los Angeles. In 2005, he worked as a college football analyst for Fox Sports Radio. Then in 2006 he signed with CSTV, a division of CBS, to work as a color commentator and analyst in their coverage of college football games. Rix was the sideline reporter for FOX Sports for the 2006 Cotton Bowl Classic between Texas Tech and Alabama as well as a FOX NFL game between the San Diego Chargers and the Arizona Cardinals. In 2007, Chris Rix served as a college football studio analyst for ABC in Los Angeles.

Rix currently is a college football and NFL analyst for Fox Sports Radio. He is also a regular contributor on the Chris Myers and Steve Hartman Show, along with hosting Fox Gametime segments as a part of the Clear Channel Radio Affiliate.

After his playing career Rix founded the Champion Training Academy, and The Champion Organization. The venture focuses on developing and mentoring young athletes. In the spring of 2008, Bishop Amat High School named Rix as the school's varsity quarterbacks coach. Following one successful season, Rix resigned as a full-time coach to focus on family, sportscasting, and ministry.

Chris Rix served as the Master of Ceremonies for the BCS National Championship Breakfast on January 5, 2010 which featured the Texas Longhorns and the Alabama Crimson Tide. The event was hosted by the Fellowship of Christian Athletes in which Rix is also currently on staff as a Director of Ministries in Southern California.

Ministry
In 2010, the Fellowship of Christian Athletes sports ministry hired Chris Rix, where he serves on staff as the Director of Ministries for the San Gabriel Valley in Los Angeles, CA.

Personal
Rix currently resides in Diamond Bar, CA, a suburb of Los Angeles, with his wife Anita, and their three children. He runs the Champion Training Academy. He also runs P.E. at Western Christian P.S.P

References

External links
 Chris Rix Academy
 ESPN Player Page
 Florida State's Biography page

1981 births
Living people
People from San Luis Obispo County, California
American football quarterbacks
Florida State Seminoles football players
American sportspeople of Filipino descent
American people of German descent
American people of Irish descent
College football announcers
National Football League announcers
High school football announcers in the United States
Leaders of the Fellowship of Christian Athletes